A ditch is a small depression created to channel water.

Ditch or The Ditch may also refer to

 Ditch (fortification)
 Tasman Sea, informally referred to as the Ditch
 Truancy
 Ditch (obstacle), an obstacle in cross-country equestrianism
 ditch, (magazine)
 The Ditch (website), an Irish investigative News website
 Ditch Davey, an Australian actor
 The Ditch, a 2010 film
 Hydrangea aspera 'The Ditch', a flowering plant cultivar
 Ditching, the controlled but unintentional water landing of an aircraft

See also
 Ditsch, a German snack bar chain